Prospect Historic District is a residential historic district in Pasadena, California, consisting of homes along Prospect Boulevard and several surrounding streets. The district includes 108 residences and roughly encompasses the Prospect Park and Arroyo Park Tracts, a pair of early Pasadena subdivisions. Development on the Prospect Park Tract began in 1904, and the first house was built there in 1906. The Arroyo Park Tract was first surveyed in 1910, and its development soon followed; the two tracts were linked by the Prospect Boulevard Bridge, which was built in 1908. The houses in the district represent a wide variety of architectural styles and include works by several prominent architects, such as Frank Lloyd Wright's Millard House, Charles and Henry Greene's Bentz House, and a 1909 mansion designed by Alfred and Arthur Heineman. The varied architecture of the district's homes is united by its landscaping, particularly through the camphor trees which line its streets.

The district was added to the National Register of Historic Places on April 7, 1983.

References

External links

National Register of Historic Places in Pasadena, California
Buildings and structures on the National Register of Historic Places in Pasadena, California
Houses in Pasadena, California
Historic districts on the National Register of Historic Places in California